Pépé Kallé, sometimes written as Pepe Kalle (November 30, 1951 – November 29, 1998) was a Congolese soukous singer, musician and bandleader.

Biography 
Pépé Kallé was born Kabasele Yampanya in Kinshasa (then Léopoldville) in the Belgian Congo, but later assumed his pseudonym in hommage to his mentor, Le Grand Kallé.

Known affectionately as "the elephant of African music" and "La Bombe Atomique,"  Kallé entertained audiences with his robust performances. The guitarist was Solomon.

Musical career

His musical career started with l'African Jazz, the band of Le Grand Kallé. He later performed in Bella Bella and became the lead singer of Lipua Lipua, where he sang alongside Nyboma Mwandido. In 1972, Kallé along with Dilu Dilumona and Papy Tex, left Lipua Lipua to form their own band named Empire Bakuba. Empire Bakuba took its name from a Congolese warrior tribe, and it pointedly incorporated rootsy rhythms from the interior, sounds that had long been sidelined by popular rumba. The band was an instant hit, and together with Zaiko Langa Langa they became Kinshasa's most popular youth band. With hits such as Pépé Kallé's Dadou and Papy Tex's Sango ya mawa, the band was a constant fixture on the charts. They also created a new dance, the kwassa kwassa.

On their tenth anniversary in 1982, the band was voted Zaire's top group. Throughout the early 1980s, Empire Bakuba continued to tour extensively while releasing no less than four albums a year. By the mid eighties, they had a large following throughout Francophone Central and West Africa. His 1986 collaboration with Nyboma labelled Zouke zouke was one of the years top selling albums . But it was his second collaboration with Nyboma, Moyibi (1988), which launched his popularity throughout Africa. In the song Moyibi, there's a part at the end that says Bakule, bakule. The bakule part is taken from a Rock-a-Mambo song named Bakoule (Bidama), written by Honore Liengo in 1961.

In the late 1980s and early 1990s, Kallé fused elements of the fast-paced version of soukous produced in Paris studios. His 1990 album, Roger milla  – a tribute to the exploits of the great Camerounian Football player, is a classic example of this arrangement.

Pépé Kallé later introduced some dancers with growth disabilities like Jolie Bebe, Dominic Mabwa and Ayilla Emoro in to his band.
In 1992 the band faced its first major calamity when Emoro, the band's dancing dwarf, died while on tour in Botswana. Despite this setback, Pépé Kallé's popularity continued to soar in the nineties as he released albums like Gigantafrique, Larger than life and Cocktail.

He also collaborated with other legends like Lutumba Simaro and N'Yoka Longo.

Death
On November 28, 1998, Pépé Kallé suffered a heart attack at his home in Kinshasa and was rushed to the nearby Clinique Ngaliema.
Shortly after midnight on Sunday November 29, Pépé Kallé was pronounced dead.
The cause of his death was officially reported to be a heart attack.
After his death, minister for culture and arts Juliana Lumumba announced that the government would hold a funeral for the fallen hero on December 6. Further she requested that all music performances be halted in his honour.
Upon his death Kallé received praise from government ministers and the common people as well.
His body lay at several locations throughout the city where he had lived and worked. More than one million people were reported to have paid their final respects at his funeral at the Palais du Peuple and along the funeral procession route. Pépé Kallé was buried on December 6 at Gombe Cemetery in a grandiose state funeral. He is part of the growing pantheon of Congolese music stars who died much too young.  He is survived by his five children. His wife died recently in 2019. People described him as a very talented musician and band leader.  Others described him as a patriot who loved his country even when times were tough.  "Despite bleak conditions in Zaïre/Congo during Mobutu's last years and under the faltering regime of Laurent Kabila, Pépé Kallé continued to reside in Kinshasa, refusing to join the mass movement of music stars to Europe.  He was the only musician who never had a problem with anybody. He was able to reconcile two musical generations," said Tabu Ley.

Veteran Congolese journalist Achille Ngoie, who covered Empire Bakuba from its inception, remembered Kallé as a man of the people. "Kallé could be on stage in the middle of a song and, seeing a person in the audience he hadn't seen for years, he could work a greeting to that person into the song. "He was an extraordinary person with an elephantine memory.”

See also
Soukous
Nyboma
Empire Bakuba
Kwassa Kwassa

References

External links
 Pepe Kalle at Africa Music Centre
 Pepe Kalle at Afropop

1951 births
1998 deaths
People from Kinshasa
20th-century Democratic Republic of the Congo male singers
Soukous musicians